Physostegia, the lionshearts or false dragonheads  (in reference to their similarity to Dracocephalum), is a genus of flowering plants in the family Lamiaceae, native to North America (United States, Canada, northern Mexico). They are erect rhizomatous herbaceous perennials inhabiting damp, sunny places. 

The generic name comes from two Greek words, physa (a bladder) and stege (a covering), referring to the calyx, which becomes full of fruit when mature.

Physostegia virginiana is the most common species, and is known as "obedient plant".

Species
 Physostegia angustifolia Fernald - lower Mississippi Valley, southern Great Plains
 Physostegia correllii  (Lundell) Shinners - Texas, northern Mexico
 Physostegia digitalis Small - Texas, Louisiana, Arkansas, Alabama
 Physostegia godfreyi P.D.Cantino - Florida Panhandle
 Physostegia intermedia (Nutt.) Engelm. & A.Gray - lower Mississippi Valley, southern Great Plains
 Physostegia ledinghamii (B.Boivin) P.D.Cantino - Northwest Territories, Alberta, Saskatchewan, Manitoba, North Dakota
 Physostegia leptophylla Small - Southeast from Florida to Virginia
 Physostegia longisepala P.D.Cantino  - Texas, Louisiana
 Physostegia parviflora Nutt. ex A.Gray - western Canada (Manitoba to British Columbia), northwestern + north-central United States (Illinois to Washington)
 Physostegia pulchella Lundell - eastern Texas
 Physostegia purpurea (Walter) S.F.Blake - Southeast from Florida to North Carolina
 Physostegia virginiana (L.) Benth. - much of eastern + central US + Canada; northeastern Mexico

References

External links 
 University of Texas Herbarium

Lamiaceae
Lamiaceae genera
Flora of North America